Stockton Municipal Airport  is a city-owned, public-use airport located three nautical miles (6 km) southwest of the central business district of Stockton, a city in Rooks County, Kansas, United States.

Facilities and aircraft 
Stockton Municipal Airport covers an area of 116 acres (47 ha) at an elevation of 1,973 feet (601 m) above mean sea level. It has one runway designated 17/35 with a turf surface measuring 3,500 by 240 feet (1,067 x 73 m). For the 12-month period ending May 27, 2010, the airport had 650 aircraft operations, an average of 54 per month: 100% general aviation.

References

External links 
 Stockton Municipal Airport at Kansas DOT website
 Aerial image as of August 1991 from USGS The National Map
 

Defunct airports in Kansas
Airports in Kansas
Buildings and structures in Rooks County, Kansas
Transportation in Rooks County, Kansas